1001 Books You Must Read Before You Die is a literary reference book compiled by over one hundred literary critics worldwide and edited by Peter Boxall, Professor of English at Sussex University, with an introduction by Peter Ackroyd. Each title is accompanied by a brief synopsis and critique briefly explaining why the book was chosen. Some entries have illustrations. This book is part of a series from Quintessence Editions Ltd.

The list 

The list contains 1001 titles and is made up of novels, short stories, and short story collections. There is also one pamphlet (A Modest Proposal), one book of collected text (Adjunct: An Undigest), and one graphic novel (Watchmen). The most featured authors on the 2006 list are J. M. Coetzee and Charles Dickens with ten titles each.

There was a major revision of 280 odd titles in 2008. The clear shift within the list has been the removal of ~300 works almost entirely by English-language authors who have more than one title on the original list in favour of lesser known works, often by non-English-language writers.

The 2010 revised and updated edition of the book is less Anglocentric and lists only four titles from Dickens and five from Coetzee, who has the most of any writer on the list. It also includes a collection of essays by Albert Camus, The Rebel.

Minor changes of fewer than 20 books were made in 2010 and 2012.

Editions 
 1001 Books You Must Read Before You Die, edited by Dr. Peter Boxall, Universe Publishing, United Kingdom, 2006 9781844-34178. First Edition
 1001 Books You Must Read Before You Die, edited by Dr. Peter Boxall, Universe Publishing, New York, 2006 9780789314206
 1001 Books You Must Read Before You Die, edited by Dr. Peter Boxall, Universe Publishing New York, 2008 9781844036141
 1001 Books You Must Read Before You Die, edited by Dr. Peter Boxall, Universe Publishing New York, 2010 9780789320391
 1001 Books You Must Read Before You Die, edited by Dr. Peter Boxall, Universe Publishing New York, 2012 9781844037407

References

Top book lists
Books about books
Cassell (publisher) books
2006 books